Marco Giustiniani (1655–1735) was a Roman Catholic prelate who served as Bishop of Torcello (1692–1735).

Biography
Marco Giustiniani was born in Venice, Italy on 12 February 1655. He was ordained a deacon on 20 January 1692 and a priest on 27 January 1692. On 24 March 1692, he was appointed during the papacy of Pope Innocent XII as Bishop of Torcello. On 30 March 1692, he was consecrated bishop. He served as Bishop of Torcello until his death on 2 March 1735. While bishop, he was the principal co-consecrator of Francesco Andrea Grassi, Bishop of Caorle (1700) and Pietro Barbarigo, Patriarch of Venice (1706).

References

External links and additional sources
 (for Chronology of Bishops) 
 (for Chronology of Bishops) 

17th-century Roman Catholic bishops in the Republic of Venice
18th-century Italian Roman Catholic bishops
Bishops appointed by Pope Innocent XII
Marco
1655 births
1735 deaths